Hinduism is a minority faith in Belize. According to 2010 census, 0.2% of Belize population is Hindu.

Demographics

However, the Association of Religion Data Archives states that as of 2005, 2.0% identify as Hindu. According to other sources it is 2.3%.

History
The Hindu community in Belize today consists mostly of families who arrived in the 1950s, when Belize was still a British colony.  The community is composed almost entirely of Sindhis and so there are few cultural differences within it.

Today
Though 3.9% of the population of Belize are Indians, most of them are Christians. Only about 40% are still Hindus.

There are two Hindu temples in Belize, one on Albert Street, Belize city and Sukh Shanti Temple, Corozal. Festivals like Diwali, Janmashtmi are celebrated by Hindus in this temple.

References

External links
International Religious Freedom Report 2006, Belize
The facts about East Indians
Hindus celebrate Diwali in Belize
Indian Diaspora in South America/ Belize

Asian Belizean
Religion in Belize
Belize
1857 establishments in the British Empire
Belize